Women's College, Silchar,  established in 1963 at Silchar, is a women's higher education institution in India. It offers Intermediate (10+2 level) and First Degree Level (10+2+3 level) courses in Arts and Commerce. The College also offers short term Diploma & Certificate courses. It is recognized by UGC and is affiliated to Assam University, Silchar. The college has been accredited by National Assessment and Accreditation Council (NAAC) with B status.

References

Educational institutions established in 1963
Cachar district
Women's universities and colleges in Assam
1963 establishments in Assam
Colleges affiliated to Assam University